Scandinavian Academy of Industrial Engineering and Management (ScAIEM), founded in 2012, is an academic association with members from Iceland, Norway, Denmark, Sweden, and Finland that facilitate collaboration, knowledge sharing and dissemination of best practices between universities within the industrial engineering and management (IEM) field.

Annual conference
ScAIEM host an annual conference to promote education, research, and application of the field of IEM in the Nordic region.  The first conference was arranged in November 2013.

ScAIEM is governed by a board of seven elected board members from its member institutions. The IMIT foundation in Gothenburg is the secretariat of ScAIEM.

So far 10 conferences have been held at the following venues:

The 1st ScAIEM conference: Lund University (2013), Sweden
The 2nd ScAIEM conference: Aalto University (2014), Finland
The 3rd ScAIEM conference: Technical University of Denmark (2015)
The 4th ScAIEM conference: Luleå University of Technology (2016), Sweden 
The 5th ScAIEM conference: Norwegian University of Science and Technology (2017)
The 6th ScAIEM conference: University of Oulu, Finland (2018)
The 7th ScAIEM conference: KTH Royal Institute of Technology, Sweden (2019) 
The 8th ScAIEM conference: DTU Danish Technical University (virtual), Denmark (2020) 
The 9th ScAIEM conference: DTU Danish Technical University (virtual), Denmark (2021) 
The 10th ScAIEM conference: Uppsala University, Sweden (2022)

References 

College and university associations and consortia in Europe
Learned societies of Sweden
Non-profit organizations based in Sweden
Organizations based in Gothenburg
Organizations established in 2012